Jhutha Sach is a novel written by Yashpal in two volumes. These two volumes of Jhutha Sach are based on the events surrounding the Partition of India.

The first volume of the novel was published in 1958 under the title Vatan Aur Desh and two years later the second volume Desh Ka Bhavishya completed the novel series.

In this novel series, he has beautifully portrayed the conflict to simplistic terms of class warfare. The scope and realism of this novel has resulted in its favorable comparison with Leo Tolstoy's War and Peace.

References

1958 novels
1960 novels
Books about politics of India
Hindi-language novels
Rajkamal Prakashan books
1960 Indian novels
1958 Indian novels
Lahore in fiction